Rudi Prinsloo is a South African rugby league footballer for the Brakpan Bears. He is a South African international, and has played in the 2013 Rugby League World Cup qualifying against Jamaica and the USA.

References

Year of birth missing (living people)
Living people
South African rugby league players
South Africa national rugby league team players
Brakpan Bears players
Rugby league second-rows